The Wilmer Way footbridge is a pedestrian bridge over London's North Circular Road in Arnos Grove. The bridge joins Wilmer Way in the north and Ollerton Road in the south.

The bridge was opened in the summer of 2012 and replaced a pelican crossing. A routine inspection by Transport for London in 2014 revealed defects in the structure, leading the bridge's staircase to be closed off for repairs. Delays in carrying out the work resulted in questions being asked of Boris Johnson, the London Mayor, at the London Assembly during the Mayor's Question Time.

References

External links 

Pedestrian footbridge at Wilmer Way - Bowes Road. Bowes & Bounds Connected.

Pedestrian bridges in London
Buildings and structures in the London Borough of Enfield
Bridges completed in 2012